National Route 432 is a national highway of Japan connecting Takehara, Hiroshima and Matsue, Shimane in Japan, with a total length of 211 km (131.11 mi).

References

National highways in Japan
Roads in Hiroshima Prefecture
Roads in Shimane Prefecture